Benoy Krishna Tikader (1928–1994) was an Indian arachnologist and zoologist and a leading expert on Indian spiders in his time. He worked in the Zoological Survey of India and published the Handbook of Indian Spiders in 1987. The book describes 40 families and 1066 species of India, many of which were described by Tikader himself. The handbook is a guide to all arachnids including scorpions, and not just spiders. He was also a popular scientific author in his native language of Bengali, and was the author of Banglar Makorsha (literally: "Bengal's spiders") for the layman.

Focus on eastern India
Working in the Zoological Survey of India based in Kolkata, Tikader was especially interested in the spiders of eastern India and the Andaman and Nicobar Islands. Many of his nomenclatures thus bear names of places in eastern India as part of their specific scientific name - like andamanensis (from the Andaman Islands), bengalensis (from the region of Bengal, and dhakuriensis (from the neighbourhood of Dhakuria, in Kolkata, often based on the region of discovery or distribution.

Honours
He held PhD and DSc degrees from Calcutta University. A number of species were named after him by his colleagues:

Fish:
 Nemacheilus tikaderi (originally Aborichthys tikaderi ) of the family Balitoridae (Barman, 1985)

Spiders:
Nodocion tikaderi of the family Gnaphosidae (Gajbe, 1992) 
Eilica tikaderi of the family Gnaphosidae (Platnick, 1976)
Drassodes tikaderi (Gajbe, 1987)
Poecilochroa tikaderi of the family Gnaphosidae (Patel, 1989)
Petrotricha tikaderi of the family Gnaphosidae (Gajbe, 1983)
Scopoides tikaderi of the family Gnaphosidae (Gajbe, 1987)
Mimetus tikaderi of the family Mimetidae (Gajbe, 1992)
Marpissa tikaderi (Biswas, 1984)
Chorizopes tikaderi of the family Araneidae (Sadana & Kaur, 1974)
Olios tikaderi of the family Sparassidae (Kundu, Biswas & Raychaudhuri, 1999)
Clubiona tikaderi of the family Clubionidae (Majumder & Tikader, 1991)
Pardosa tikaderi of the family Lycosidae (Arora & Monga, 1994)
Oxyopes tikaderi of the family Oxyopidae (Biswas & Majumder, 1995)
Theridion tikaderi (Patel, 1973)
Pistius tikaderi (Kumari & Mittal, 1999)
Xysticus tikaderi (Bhandari & Gajbe, 2001)
Storena tikaderi of the family Zodariidae (Patel & Reddy, 1989)

Important publications

Tikader B K (1982), Fauna of India: Arachnid Vol 2: Spiders, Zoological Survey of India
Tikader B K (1983), Threatened Animals of India, Zoological Survey of India, Calcutta
Tikader B K and Bastwade D (1983), Fauna of India: Arachnid Vol 3: Scorpions, Zoological Survey of India, Calcutta, India. 
Tikader B K (1987) Handbook of Indian Spiders, Zoological Survey of India, Calcutta, India.
 Tikader B K and RC Sharma (December 1985), Handbook of Indian Testudines, Zoological Survey of India, Calcutta, India
 Tikader B K and Ramakrishna (December 1988), Role of Spinning Apparatus in Non-Orb-Weaving and Orb-Weaving Spiders from India, Zoological Survey of India, Calcutta, India.
 Tikader B K and Animesh Bal (January 1981), Studies on Some Orb-Weaving Spiders of the Genera Neoscona Simon and Araneus Clerck of the Family Araneidae from India, Zoological Survey of India, Calcutta, India

Personal life 
He was married to Late Mridula Tikader and is survived by his daughter, Sujata Mazumdar, and sons Shyamal Tikader and Sajal Tikader.

References

External links 

 Scanned publications by Tikader

Indian entomologists
Indian naturalists
1928 births
1994 deaths
Arachnologists
University of Calcutta alumni
20th-century Indian zoologists
20th-century naturalists